Vaca, is an abbreviation of "vacation".

Vaca also may refer to:

Geography
Vaca Mountains, a mountain range in Napa County, California
Vaca Díez Province, Bolivia
Vaca Mare River, a tributary of the Siriu River in Romania
Vaca Mică River, a tributary of the Siriu River in Romania
Mount Vaca, located in northern California
Key Vaca, an island in the middle Florida Keys
Vaca, the former name for Crișan village, Ribița Commune, Hunedoara County, Romania

People
Danny Vaca (born 1990), Ecuadorian football (soccer) player
Doyle Vaca (born 1979), Bolivian football (soccer) player
Edder Vaca (born 1985), Ecuadorian football (soccer) player
Eduardo Vaca (1944–1998), Argentine politician 
Farides Vaca (born 1969), Bolivian politician
Jorge Vaca (born 1959), Mexican boxer
Joselito Vaca (born 1984), Bolivian football (soccer) player

Other uses
Vaca Valley Railroad, operated at Vacaville, California in the late 19th century

See also
 Lavaca (disambiguation)
 Vaka (disambiguation)